Alain Marleix (born on 2 January 1946 in Paris) is a French politician. He was the Secretary of State for Veterans in the government of François Fillon from June 2007 to March 2008. From 2008 to 2010 he is in charge of the redefinition of Boundary delimitation for the elections to the Assemblée Nationale.

Alain Marleix began his political career as a vice-representative for Georges Pompidou in the Assembléee Nationale, who was then representative for Saint-Flour in the Cantal. Alain Marleix was initially close to Charles Pasqua. During the 1993 presidential election, he supported Edouard Balladur against Jacques Chirac. Since then, he has been supporting Nicolas Sarkozy.
 Degree from Ecole supérieure de journalisme
 Degree of political science
 Parliamentary journalist, head of the political department of the daily La Nation, from 1968 to 1976

Political career
Governmental functions
Secretary of State for Veterans : 2007-2008.
Secretary of State for Local Authorities : 2008-2010.

Electoral mandates
European Parliament
Member of European Parliament : 1984-1993 (Resignation). Elected in 1984, reelected in 1989.

National Assembly of France
Member of the National Assembly of France for Cantal (2nd constituency) : 1993-2007 (Became secretary of State in 2007) / And since 2010. Elected in 1993, reelected in 1997, 2002, 2007, 2012.

Regional Council
Regional councillor of Auvergne : Since 2010.

General Council
General councillor of Cantal : Since 1988. Reelected in 1994, 2001, 2008.

Municipal Council
Mayor of Massiac : 1995-2008. Reelected in 2001.
Municipal councillor of Massiac : 1995-2008. Reelected in 2001.

Political functions
 National secretary of UMP, in charge of elections, since 2005

References

1946 births
Living people
Politicians from Paris
Rally for the Republic politicians
Union for a Popular Movement politicians
The Strong Right
Secretaries of State of France
Mayors of places in Auvergne-Rhône-Alpes
MEPs for France 1984–1989
MEPs for France 1989–1994
Deputies of the 12th National Assembly of the French Fifth Republic
Deputies of the 13th National Assembly of the French Fifth Republic
Deputies of the 14th National Assembly of the French Fifth Republic
Regional councillors of Auvergne-Rhône-Alpes